Kikoin (feminine: Kikoina) is a Russian Jewish family name. Its transliteration into French is Kikoïne. Some, including Konstantin Berkovich, son of Abram Kikoin, suggest that the surname originated from the name of an obscure biblical plant kikayon. Konstantin claims that according to his genealogical research the surname ascends to a Gomel rabbi, who decided to change his mundane surname Schmidt. Notable people with the surname include:

 (1914-1999), Lithuanian Jewish and Soviet physicist
 (born 1977), French actress 
 (born 1946), French film director and producer
Isaak Kikoin (1908-1984),  Lithuanian Jewish and Soviet physicist
Michel Kikoine (1892-1968), Lithuanian-Jewish French painter

See also
Mordechai Kikayon

References

Russian-Jewish surnames